Enemy/Lover is the debut album of Dreamers of the Ghetto. It was recorded in 2011 in Bloomington, Indiana, at Russian Recording and was released through Temporary Residence Limited.

Dreamers of the Ghetto's first full-length album combines a mix of tight harmonies and soaring choruses. Paul Thompson of Pitchfork calls the album "mainstage big."

Every song on the album was written and performed by Dreamers of the Ghetto. Artwork was done by Jeremy Geddes.

Track listing
"Antenna" – 1:55
"State of a Dream" – 3:08
"Connection" – 4:20
"Regulator" – 4:07
"Always" – 6:41
"Crime Scene" – 1:20
"Phone Call" – 5:21
"Dark Falcons" – 4:21
"Night Hawks" – 3:13
"The Canals of Our City" – 4:27
"Tether" – 7:26

Personnel
 Luke Aaron Jones: vocals, bass, synthesizers
 Jonathan Jones: guitars, vocals, beats, synthesizers
 Lauren Jones: vocals, synthesizers
 Marty Sprowles: drums, beats, Thunder and Lightning

References

2011 debut albums